The Cardinal Mercier Prize for International Philosophy is a prize given to recognise the recipients contribution to international philosophy. It is awarded jointly by the Higher Institute of Philosophy at the Université catholique de Louvain and the Institute of Philosophy at KU Leuven. The prize is named after the theologian Cardinal Désiré-Joseph Mercier and has been won by Fulton J. Sheen in 1923, John F. Wippel in 1981, and Nicholas Rescher in 2005, and William Simpson in 2021.

References

Philosophy awards